This item lists those birds of South Asia in the non-passerine families other than the Megapodes, Galliformes, Gruiformes and near passerines.

For an introduction to the birds of the region and a key to the status abbreviations, see List of birds of the Indian subcontinent.

For the rest of the species lists, see:
 part 1 Megapodes, Galliformes, Gruiformes and near passerines.
 part 3 Passerines from pittas to cisticolas
 part 4 Passerines from Old World warblers to buntings.

Pterocliformes
 Family: Pteroclidae
 Tibetan sandgrouse r Syrrhaptes tibetanus
 Pallas’s sandgrouse V Syrrhaptes paradoxus
 Pin-tailed sandgrouse W Pterocles alchata
 Chestnut-bellied sandgrouse r Pterocles exustus
 Spotted sandgrouse W Pterocles senegallus
 Black-bellied sandgrouse rw Pterocles orientalis
 Crowned sandgrouse Pterocles coronatus
 Painted sandgrouse r Pterocles indicus
 Lichtenstein's sandgrouse r Pterocles lichtensteinii

Charadriiformes
 Family: Scolopacidae
 Eurasian woodcock rW Scolopax rusticola
 Solitary snipe r Gallinago solitaria
 Wood snipe V r Gallinago nemoricola
 Pintail snipe W Gallinago stenura
 Swinhoe's snipe W Gallinago megala
 Great snipe V Gallinago media
 Common snipe rW Gallinago gallinago
 Jack snipe W Lymnocryptes minimus
 Black-tailed godwit W Limosa limosa
 Bar-tailed godwit W Limosa lapponica
 Whimbrel W Numenius phaeopus
 Eurasian curlew W Numenius arquata
 Far Eastern curlew Numenius madagascariensis
 Spotted redshank W Tringa erythropus
 Common redshank sW Tringa totanus
 Marsh sandpiper W Tringa stagnatilis
 Common greenshank W Tringa nebularia
 Nordmann's greenshank E V Tringa guttifer
 Green sandpiper W Tringa ochropus
 Wood sandpiper W Tringa glareola
 Terek sandpiper W Xenus cinereus
 Common sandpiper sW Actitis hypoleucos
 Grey-tailed tattler Heteroscelus brevipes
 Ruddy turnstone W Arenaria interpres
 Long billed dowitcher Limnodromus scolopaceus
 Asian dowitcher N W Limnodromus semipalmatus
 Great knot W Calidris tenuirostris
 Red knot W Calidris canutus
 Sanderling W Calidris alba
 Spoon-billed sandpiper V w Eurynorhynchus pygmeus
 Little stint W Calidris minuta
 Red-necked stint W Calidris ruficollis
 Temminck's stint W Calidris temminckii
 Long-toed stint W Calidris subminuta
 Sharp-tailed sandpiper V Calidris acuminata
 Pectoral sandpiper V Calidris melanotos
 Dunlin W Calidris alpina
 Curlew sandpiper W Calidris ferruginea
 Buff-breasted sandpiper V Tryngites subruficollis
 Broad-billed sandpiper W Limicola falcinellus
 Ruff W Philomachus pugnax
 Red-necked phalarope W Phalaropus lobatus
 Grey phalarope V Phalaropus fulicaria
 Family: Rostratulidae
 Greater painted-snipe r Rostratula benghalensis
 Family: Jacanidae
 Pheasant-tailed jacana R Hydrophasianus chirurgus
 Bronze-winged jacana R Metopidius indicus
 Family: Burhinidae
 Stone curlew R Burhinus oedicnemus
 Great thick-knee r Esacus recurvirostris
 Beach thick-knee Nr Esacus neglectus
 Family Haematopodidae
 Eurasian oystercatcher W Haematopus ostralegus
 Family Recurvirostridae
 Ibisbill r Ibidorhyncha struthersii
 Black-winged stilt RW  Himantopus himantopus
 Pied avocet rW  Recurvirostra avosetta
 Family Charadriidae
 Eurasian golden plover V Pluvialis apricaria
 Pacific golden plover W Pluvialis fulva
 Grey plover W Pluvialis squatarola
 Common ringed plover W Charadrius hiaticula
 Long-billed plover W Charadrius placidus
 Little ringed plover RW  Charadrius dubius
 Kentish plover RW  Charadrius alexandrinus
 Lesser sand plover sW  Charadrius mongolus
 Greater sand plover W Charadrius leschenaultii
 Caspian plover V Charadrius asiaticus
 Oriental plover V Charadrius veredus
 Black-fronted dotterel V Elseyornis melanops
 Northern lapwing W Vanellus vanellus
 Yellow-wattled lapwing r Vanellus malarbaricus
 River lapwing R Vanellus duvaucelii
 Grey-headed lapwing W Vanellus cinereus
 Red-wattled lapwing R Vanellus indicus
 Sociable lapwing V w Vanellus gregarius
 White-tailed lapwing W Vanellus leucurus
 Family Dromadidae
 Crab-plover W Dromas ardeola
 Family: Glareolidae
 Jerdon's courser Cr Rhinoptilus bitorquatus
 Cream-colored courser rw  Cursorius cursor
 Indian courser r Cursorius coromandelicus
 Collared pratincole rw  Glareola pratincola
 Oriental pratincole R Glareola maldivarum
 Small pratincole R Glareola lactea
 Family Stercorariidae
 Brown skua sp Catharacta antarctica
 South polar skua V Catharacta maccormicki
 Pomarine skua W Stercorarius pomarinus
 Arctic skua W Stercorarius parasiticus
 Family Rynchopidae
 Indian skimmer V r Rynchops albicollis
 Family: Laridae
 White-eyed gull V Larus leucophthalmus
 Sooty gull V Larus hemprichii
 Common gull V Larus canus
 Caspian gull W Larus cachinnans
 Armenian gull Larus armenicus
 Heuglin's gull W Larus heuglini
 Great black-headed gull W Larus ichthyaetus
 Brown-headed gull sW Larus brunnicephalus
 Black-headed gull W Larus ridibundus
 Slender-billed gull W Larus genei
 Little gull V Larus minutus
 Family Sternidae
 Gull-billed tern rW Gelochelidon nilotica
 Caspian tern W Hydroprogne caspia
 River tern R Sterna aurantia
 Lesser crested tern r Sterna bengalensis
 Great crested tern r Sterna bergii
 Sandwich tern W Sterna sandvicensis
 Roseate tern r Sterna dougallii
 Black-naped tern r Sterna sumatrana
 Common tern sW Sterna hirundo
 Arctic tern V Sterna paradisaea
 White-cheeked tern p Sterna repressa
 Black-bellied tern N r Sterna acuticauda
 Little tern r Sternula albifrons
 Saunders's tern r Sternula saundersi
 Bridled tern s Onychoprion anaethetus
 Sooty tern s Onychoprion fuscata
 Whiskered tern RW Chlidonias hybridus
 White-winged black tern W Chlidonias leucopterus
 Black tern V Chlidonias niger
 Brown noddy V Anous stolidus
 Black noddy V Anous minutus
 Lesser noddy Anous tenuirostris
 White tern r Gygis alba

Falconiformes
 Family Pandionidae
 Osprey rW Pandion haliaetus
 Family: Accipitridae
 Jerdon's baza r Aviceda jerdoni
 Black baza r Aviceda leuphotes
 Oriental honey-buzzard RW Pernis ptilorhyncus
 Black-shouldered kite R Elanus caeruleus
 Red kite V Milvus milvus
 Black kite RW Milvus migrans
 Brahminy kite R Haliastur indus
 White-bellied sea eagle R Haliaeetus leucogaster
 Pallas's fish eagle V r Haliaeetus leucoryphus
 White-tailed eagle N W Haliaeetus albicilla
 Lesser fish eagle r N Ichthyophaga humilis
 Grey-headed fish eagle N r Ichthyophaga ichthyaetus
 Lammergeier r Gypaetus barbatus
 Egyptian vulture R Neophron percnopterus
 White-rumped vulture C r Gyps bengalensis
 Long-billed vulture C r Gyps indicus
 Slender-billed vulture r ? Gyps tenuirostris
 Himalayan griffon vulture r Gyps himalayensis
 Griffon vulture r Gyps fulvus
 Cinereous vulture N rw Aegypius monachus
 Red-headed vulture Nr Sarcogyps calvus
 Short-toed eagle r Circaetus gallicus
 Crested serpent eagle R Spilornis cheela
 Nicobar serpent eagle N r Spilornis minimus
 Andaman serpent eagle N r Spilornis elgini
 Marsh harrier W Circus aeruginosus
 Hen harrier W Circus cyaneus
 Pallid harrier N W Circus macrourus
 Pied harrier rw Circus melanoleucos
 Montagu's harrier W Circus pygargus
 Crested goshawk r Accipiter trivirgatus
 Shikra R Accipiter badius
 Nicobar sparrowhawk N r Accipiter butleri
 Chinese sparrowhawk W Accipiter soloensis
 Japanese sparrowhawk W Accipiter gularis
 Besra r Accipiter virgatus
 Eurasian sparrowhawk rw Accipiter nisus
 Northern goshawk rw Accipiter gentilis
 White-eyed buzzard R Butastur teesa
 Grey-faced buzzard V Butastur indicus
 Common buzzard rw Buteo buteo
 Long-legged buzzard rW Buteo rufinus
 Upland buzzard W Buteo hemilasius
 Rough-legged buzzard V Buteo lagopus
 Black eagle r Ictinaetus malayensis
 Lesser spotted eagle r Aquila pomarina
 Greater spotted eagle V W Aquila clanga
 Tawny eagle R Aquila rapax
 Steppe eagle W Aquila nipalensis
 Eastern imperial eagle V w Aquila heliaca
 Golden eagle r Aquila chrysaetos
 Bonelli's eagle r Hieraaetus fasciatus
 Booted eagle W Hieraaetus pennatus
 Rufous-bellied eagle r Hieraaetus kienerii
 Changeable hawk eagle R Spizaetus cirrhatus
 Mountain hawk eagle r Spizaetus nipalensis
 Family: Falconidae
 Collared falconet r Microhierax caerulescens
 Pied falconet r Microhierax melanoleucus
 Lesser kestrel V p Falco naumanni
 Common kestrel RW Falco tinnunculus
 Red-necked falcon r Falco chicquera
 Amur falcon p Falco amurensis
 Sooty falcon Falco concolor
 Merlin W Falco columbarius
 Eurasian hobby rp Falco subbuteo
 Oriental hobby r Falco severus
 Laggar falcon r Falco jugger
 Saker falcon W Falco cherrug
 Peregrine falcon rw Falco peregrinus

Podicipediformes
 Family: Podicipedidae
 Little grebe R Tachybaptus ruficollis
 Red-necked grebe W Podiceps grisegena
 Great crested grebe rw Podiceps cristatus
 Slavonian grebe W Podiceps auritus
 Black-necked grebe rw Podiceps nigricollis

Pelecaniformes
 Family: Phaethontidae
 Red-billed tropicbird W Phaethon aethereus
 Red-tailed tropicbird r Phaethon rubricauda
 White-tailed tropicbird r Phaethon lepturus
 Family: Sulidae
 Masked booby r Sula dactylatra
 Red-footed booby r Sula sula
 Brown booby r Sula leucogaster
 Family: Anhingidae
 Oriental darter R N Anhinga melanogaster
 Family: Phalacrocoracidae
 Pygmy cormorant  Phalacrocorax pygmeus
 Little cormorant R Phalacrocorax niger
 Indian cormorant R Phalacrocorax fuscicollis
 Great cormorant RW  Phalacrocorax carbo
 Family: Pelecanidae
 Great white pelican rW Pelecanus onocrotalus
 Dalmatian pelican D W Pelecanus crispus
 Spot-billed pelican V R Pelecanus philippensis
 Family: Fregatidae
 Great frigatebird P Fregata minor
 Lesser frigatebird r Fregata ariel
 Christmas Island frigatebird V Fregata andrewsi

Ciconiiformes
 Family: Ardeidae
 Little egret R Egretta garzetta
 Western reef egret R Egretta gularis
 Pacific reef egret r Egretta sacra
 Grey heron RW  Ardea cinerea
 Goliath heron r?  Ardea goliath
 White-bellied heron E r Ardea insignis
 Great-billed heron V Ardea sumatrana
 Purple heron R Ardea purpurea
 Eastern great egret RW Ardea modesta
 Intermediate egret R Mesophoyx intermedia
 Cattle egret R Bubulcus ibis
 Indian pond heron R Ardeola grayii
 Chinese pond heron r Ardeola bacchus
 Striated heron r Butorides striatus
 Black-crowned night heron R Nycticorax nycticorax
 Malayan night heron r Gorsachius melanolophus
 Little bittern r Ixobrychus minutus
 Yellow bittern r Ixobrychus sinensis
 Cinnamon bittern r Ixobrychus cinnamomeus
 Black bittern r Dupetor flavicollis
 Great bittern W Botaurus stellaris
 Family: Phoenicopteridae
 Greater flamingo rW  Phoenicopterus ruber
 Lesser flamingo N r Phoenicopterus minor
 Family: Threskiornithidae
 Glossy ibis RW Plegadis falcinellus
 Black-headed ibis N R Threskiornis melanocephalus
 Black ibis R Pseudibis papillosa
 Eurasian spoonbill RW Platalea leucorodia
 Family: Ciconiidae
 Painted stork N R Mycteria leucocephala
 Asian openbill R Anastomus oscitans
 Black stork W Ciconia nigra
 Woolly-necked stork R Ciconia episcopus
 White stork W Ciconia ciconia
 Oriental stork V Ciconia boyciana
 Black-necked stork N r Ephippiorhynchus asiaticus
 Lesser adjutant Vr Leptoptilos javanicus
 Greater adjutant E r Leptoptilos dubius

Gaviiformes
 Family: Gaviidae
 Red-throated diver V Gavia stellata
 Black-throated diver V Gavia arctica

Procellariiformes
 Family: Procellariidae
 Cape petrel V Daption capense
 Barau's petrel V Pterodroma baraui
 Bulwer's petrel V Bulweria bulwerii
 Jouanin's petrel V Bulweria fallax
 Streaked shearwater V Calonectris leucomelas
 Wedge-tailed shearwater s Puffinus pacificus
 Flesh-footed shearwater s Puffinus carneipes
 Sooty shearwater V Puffinus griseus
 Short-tailed shearwater V Puffinus tenuirostris
 Audubon's shearwater r Puffinus lherminieri
 Persian shearwater N P Puffinus persicus
 Family Hydrobatidae
 Wilson's storm-petrel P Oceanites oceanicus
 White-faced storm-petrel V Pelagodroma marina
 Black-bellied storm-petrel V Fregetta tropica
 White-bellied storm-petrel V Fregetta grallaria
 Swinhoe's storm-petrel p Oceanodroma monorhis

References

Splitting headaches? Recent taxonomic changes affecting the British and Western Palaearctic lists - Martin Collinson, British Birds vol 99 (June 2006), 306-323

South Asia